Daguo is a town of Xinhua District in the western part of Shijiazhuang, Hebei, People's Republic of China. , it has 4 residential communities and 3 villages under its administration.

See also
List of township-level divisions of Hebei

References

Township-level divisions of Hebei